The 1976 Campeonato Nacional de Fútbol Profesional was Chilean top tier's 44th season. Everton was the tournament's champion, winning its third title.

Standings

Scores

Championship play-off

Liguilla Pre-Copa Libertadores

Play-off match 

Universidad de Chile qualified to 1977 Copa Libertadores due to its better Liguilla's goal difference

Promotion/relegation Liguilla

Topscorer

References

External links 
ANFP 
RSSSF Chile 1976

Primera División de Chile seasons
Prim
Chile